Erich zu Putlitz (1 February 1892 – 28 January 1945) was a German architect. His work was part of the architecture event in the art competition at the 1936 Summer Olympics.

References

1892 births
1945 deaths
20th-century German architects
Olympic competitors in art competitions
People from Ludwigslust-Parchim